Catharina Ziekenhuis (English: Catharina Hospital) is a teaching hospital in Eindhoven, Netherlands. The hospital was founded in 1843, and has been at its current location since 1973. It is one of two hospitals in the city of Eindhoven, the other is Máxima Medisch Centrum, and it is the biggest hospital in the larger Eindhoven region.

History 
R.K. Binnenziekenhuis van O.L. Vrouwe van Barmhartigheid. (English: Roman Catholic Inner Hospital of our dear Lady of forgiveness), more commonly known as Binnenziekenhuis (English: Inner Hospital), was founded in 1843 by the saint Catharina parish, at the Jan van Lieshoutstraat in the inner city of Eindhoven. With new medical developments in the 20th century and growth of the population it became too small and had no way of expanding at its location.

Therefore, in July 1968 building started by contractor Meuwese, at the Michelangelolaan in Woensel. The design was made by Leo de Bever and his brother Loed. The hospital was relocated in 1973. Since it was no longer located in the inner city the board chose a new name, Catharina Ziekenhuis, named after the Catharina parish, that founded the hospital.

Healthcare 
In 2013 Catharina Ziekenhuis had 696 beds, making it the largest hospital in the Eindhoven region. With 3600 employees, out of which 210 medical specialists, it provided care for 150.000 policlinical patients, and 27.000 overnight clinical patients.

Since 2000 Catharina Ziekenhuis has been accredited four times to be up to international quality standards, valid until 2017, by Nederlands Instituut voor Accreditatie in de Zorg (English: Dutch institute for accreditation in Health Care), a member of the International Society for Quality in Health Care.

Since 2010 Catharina Ziekenhuis is one of the founding fathers of Santeon, a cooperative association of 7 Dutch hospitals. Other members of Santeon are Canisius-Wilhelmina Ziekenhuis (Nijmegen), Martini Ziekenhuis (Groningen), Medisch Spectrum Twente (Enschede and Oldenzaal), Onze Lieve Vrouwe Gasthuis (Amsterdam), Maasstad Ziekenhuis (Rotterdam) and Sint Antonius Ziekenhuis (Nieuwegein).

Media 
In 2012 the hospital made the media when it fired the group of medical specialists that made up the dermatology department, which had organised healthcare, outside hospital time, using hospital equipment, without the hospital's knowledge.

In 2014 the unions stated that there was a workfloor atmosphere of fear in the hospital, after a video got out of personnel, made by the hospital to show hygiene ethics to personnel. The bad atmosphere was later denied in a statement by the hospital, the board and medical staff.

References

External links 
 
 Santeon Group

Teaching hospitals in the Netherlands
Buildings and structures in Eindhoven